Allan Moisés Lalín Pérez (born January 5, 1981) is a Honduran footballer who plays for Platense F.C. in the Liga Nacional de Fútbol Profesional de Honduras as a forward.

Club career
The tall striker made his senior debut for Honduras Salzburg in March 2003 against Victoria, then played for Victoria before experiencing relegation with Atlético Olanchano in 2005. He went on trial with Wisła Kraków, then champions of the Polish League, but failed to impress and returned to Honduras, where he eventually went on to play with Real España. He left Real España in July 2009, to play for Khazar Lankaran in the Azerbaijan Premier League. Lalín  had his contract with Khazar Lankaran cancelled halfway through the 2010–11, citing "unsatisfactory performance". He signed for Real Espana again in July 2011, after being left out of the Khazar squad for six months by the new coach. In January 2012 he was set to move abroad again to join Chinese second division side Hunan Billows on loan to play alongside compatriots Emil Martínez, Erick Norales and Astor Henríquez. He was however not given a contract after a 15-days trial and returned to Real España. In January 2013 Lalín joined Football League side Niki Volou after his contract with Real España was not extended.
In August 2013 Lalin joined Cypriot First Division side Nea Salamis.
In January 2014 Lalin joined Football League (Greece) side Paniliakos F.C.

International career
Lalín made his debut for Honduras in an August 2006 friendly match against Venezuela and has, as of January 2013, earned a total of 14 caps, scoring 2 goals. He has represented his country at the 2009 CONCACAF Gold Cups. and helped his team progress to the Quarter-Finals by providing two crucial assists in the match against Grenada, which Honduras won by 4–0.

Career statistics

Club

International goals

|}

Personal life
Colorado Rapids footballer Hendry Thomas is his cousin.

References

External links
 

 Profile - Diez 

1981 births
Living people
Sportspeople from Tegucigalpa
Association football forwards
Honduran footballers
Honduras international footballers
2009 CONCACAF Gold Cup players
C.D. Victoria players
Atlético Olanchano players
Real C.D. España players
Khazar Lankaran FK players
Niki Volos F.C. players
Nea Salamis Famagusta FC players
Paniliakos F.C. players
Honduran expatriate footballers
Expatriate footballers in Azerbaijan
Expatriate footballers in Greece
Expatriate footballers in Cyprus
Liga Nacional de Fútbol Profesional de Honduras players
Azerbaijan Premier League players
Cypriot First Division players
Football League (Greece) players